Bab El Gorjani is one of the gates of the medina of Tunis, the capital of Tunisia.

It is one of the gates on the second enclosure of the eastern suburbs of Tunis. Built in the Turkish period, it takes its name from one of Abul Hasan ash-Shadhili's forty disciples, Sidi Ali El Gorjani, who also gave his name to a now-disused cemetery and a public park.

Equipped with an important bastion, it controls the plains of Mornag and Sebkha Sejoumi.

References

External links

Gorjani